Wea is an unincorporated community in Miami County, Kansas, United States.  It is part of the Kansas City metropolitan area.

History
The post office in Wea closed in 1903.

This community was named for the Wea Tribe that was part of the Illiniwek Confederacy that came to this reservation land in 1832 along with the Piankishaw, Peoria, and Kaskaskia Tribes.

The Kansas Nebraska Act of 1854 brought squatters who forced land cessions upon these four tribes until they removed to Indian Territory in 1867.

Education
Wea High School was the Eagles.

References

Further reading

External links
 Miami County maps: Current, Historic, KDOT

Unincorporated communities in Miami County, Kansas
Unincorporated communities in Kansas